Located on the northwest side of Bonavista Bay, Newfoundland at the mouth of the Indian Bay inlet is a small island named Silver Fox Island that was once inhabited. It is about 3 km in length and about 3 km from Fair Island. The first settling began at Warren's Harbour on the southern side of the island.

History

Warren's Harbour was the first settled, named after an early settler, John Warren, who was living at Salvage, Newfoundland, in 1675. Warren's Harbour appears in the 1836 Census with a population of eight, of the same family. By 1869 there were five families living there, the Buttons, Felthams, Hunts, Matthews', and Rogers' families. In 1884 the population was 49, there was a slow population growth, and in 1901 there were 82 people living there.

Silver Fox Island was not located near any major fishing grounds so they relied heavily on the Labrador fishery and woods work in Indian Bay during the winter.

By the mid-1950s most families were relocating to nearby communities such as Indian Bay and Wareham. By 1969 the island was completely abandoned.

Education History
The islands first school-chapel was built between 1895 and 1896. A new school was built in 1926. Some people who taught on the island were James Rogers, Jesse Oakley (of Greenspond), Stephen Hall (of Pinchard's Island), and Beatrice Feltham (of Silver Fox Island)Saul Maher 1956 - 1960(of Greenspond), Arthur Feltham (silver fox Island), .

Fishery

Fishing boats and skippers in Silver Fox Island:
 Silver Steamer
 Emma, built on the island by John Hann of Wesleyville, 1883.
 Freddy II, skippered by William Wicks of Silver Fox Island
 Polly B, first skippered by William Wicks, then Samuel Matthews, and Samuel Wicks.
 Mildred M. Bill and Margaret K skippered by William Wicks
 Freddy M skippered by Charles Feltham
 Stewart S skippered by David Button
 Green Leaf skippered by Samuel Hunt
 Merry Go built and owned by Joseph Matthews on Silver Fox Island.

Ships skippered by the Feltham family of Silver Fox Island:

- Mayflower

- Grace

- Self

- Foam, 1885

- Paddy

- Beatrice May

- Ada

- Sea Gull

- Ivanhoe

- Henerita Dawton

- Lady Bird

- Mabel

- Clara Hallett

Census Information

Directory
- Lovell's Directory describes it asan island on the north side of Bonavista Bay, distant from Greenspond by 6 miles in boat, with a population of 45 in 1871. The list of names given are:
 Thomas Button, Fisherman
 Samuel Feltham, Planter
 Jacob Hunt, Fisherman
 John Matthews, Fisherman
 William Rogers, Fisherman
 Iain Logan, Quantity Surveyor

See also
 List of communities in Newfoundland and Labrador

References

External links
 Memories of Silver Fox Island
 Information on Silver Fox Island
 Search directories, census, births, marriages, government records, and much more
 http://www.rootsweb.com/~cannf/bbnor.htm

Islands of Newfoundland and Labrador
Uninhabited islands of Newfoundland and Labrador
Ghost towns in Newfoundland and Labrador
Populated places established in 1675
Populated places disestablished in 1969
1675 establishments in the British Empire